This is a list of academic journals published by Medknow Publications.

A

B

C

D

E

F

G

H

I

J

K

L

M

N

O

P

Q

R

S

T

U

V

W

Y

External links
List of journals on Medknow Publications website

Medknow Publications